Komsomolskoye (Kharkha) is a rural locality (a selo) and the administrative centre of Komsomolskoye Rural Settlement, Yeravninsky District, Republic of Buryatia, Russia. The population was 677 as of 2017. There are 28 streets.

Geography 
Komsomolskoye is located 32 km west of Sosnovo-Ozerskoye (the district's administrative centre) by road. Gonda is the nearest rural locality.

References 

Rural localities in Yeravninsky District